Ole Bo Rasmussen (born 19 March 1952) is a Danish former professional footballer, who most notably played as a left-back professionally for German club Hertha BSC. He played 41 games and scored one goal for the Denmark national football team, and represented his country at the 1984 European Championship.

Club career 
Born in Holme-Olstrup, Rasmussen began his senior career at club Næstved IF. He made his debut for the Denmark national team in September 1975, before he moved abroad to play professionally for Hertha BSC in the Bundesliga. He made his Hertha debut in January 1976 away against 1. FC Köln, and went on to play five seasons with the team, reaching two DFB-Pokal final as well as winning the third place in the 1977–78 Bundesliga season under head coach Kuno Klötzer. When Hertha were relegated to the 2. Bundesliga after the 1980 Bundesliga season, Rasmussen moved back to Denmark to play for OB. He played a single season at Odense, before he returned to Hertha in winter 1981, and helped the club win promotion to the Bundesliga in 1982.

Hertha were relegated once more after the 1982–83 Bundesliga season, and Rasmussen stayed with the club in the 2. Bundesliga. After the 1984 European Championship, he returned to Denmark to ended his career with Næstved IF.

International career
Rasmussen was called up to represent Denmark at the 1984 European Championship, and played two of Denmark's four games before the team was eliminated in the semi-finals. He played one further Danish national team game in September 1984, bringing him to a total of 41 games and one goal for the Danish national team.

After retirement
Following his retirement from football, Rasmussen became a potato farmer in Holme-Olstrup. In 2021, he openly criticised the construction of the Baltic Pipe, a natural gas pipeline, for exceeding the areas of expropriation initially agreed on.

References

External links 
 
 

1952 births
Living people
Danish men's footballers
Denmark international footballers
Odense Boldklub players
Hertha BSC players
UEFA Euro 1984 players
Næstved Boldklub managers
Bundesliga players
2. Bundesliga players
Association football defenders
Danish football managers
Sportspeople from Region Zealand
Danish expatriate sportspeople in West Germany
Danish expatriate footballers
Expatriate footballers in West Germany